Cité may refer to:

Places
 Cité (Paris Métro), the metro station on the Île de la Cité
 Cité (Quebec), type of municipality in Quebec
 Citadel, the historical centre of an old city, originally fortified
 Housing estate,  a group of homes and other buildings built together as a single development
 Île de la Cité, an island in the Seine where Paris was founded

Arts, entertainment, and media
Cite (magazine), American quarterly magazine

See also
CITE (disambiguation)